FJC may refer to:

 Federal Judicial Center, a component of the United States federal judiciary
 Federation of Jewish Communities of the CIS
 Florida Junior College, now Florida State College at Jacksonville, in the United States
 Foundation for Jewish Camp, in the United States
 Freely-jointed chain
 Fullerton Junior College, now Fullerton College, in California, United States
 Toyota FJ Cruiser, retro style, mid-size SUV